The State House Historic District encompasses many historic buildings along West State and Willow Streets in Trenton, New Jersey, including the New Jersey State House, Old Barracks Museum, and the Old Masonic Temple.

Gallery

See also
National Register of Historic Places listings in Mercer County, New Jersey

References

Historic districts in Mercer County, New Jersey
National Register of Historic Places in Trenton, New Jersey
Trenton, New Jersey
Historic districts on the National Register of Historic Places in New Jersey
New Jersey Register of Historic Places